Paoni 13 - Coptic Calendar - Paoni 15 

The fourteenth day of the Coptic month of Paoni, the tenth month of the Coptic year. In common years, this day corresponds to June 8, of the Julian Calendar, and June 21, of the Gregorian Calendar.

Commemorations

Martyrs 

 The martyrdom of Saints Apakir, John, Ptolemy, and Phillip

Saints 

 The departure of Pope John XIX, 113th Patriarch of the See of Saint Mark

References 

Days of the Coptic calendar